Boulder Dash is a 2D maze-puzzle video game released in 1984 by First Star Software for Atari 8-bit computers. It was created by Canadian developers Peter Liepa and Chris Gray. The player controls Rockford, who collects treasures while evading hazards.

Boulder Dash was ported to many 8-bit and 16-bit systems and turned into a coin-operated arcade game. It was followed by multiple sequels and re-releases and influenced games such as Repton and direct clones such as Emerald Mine.

As of January 1, 2018, BBG Entertainment GmbH owns the intellectual property rights to Boulder Dash.

Gameplay

Boulder Dash takes place in a series of caves, each of which is laid out as rectangular grid of blocks. The player guides the player character, Rockford, with a joystick or cursor keys. In each cave, Rockford has to collect as many diamonds as are needed and avoid dangers, such as falling rocks. When enough diamonds have been collected, the exit door opens, and going through this exit door completes the cave.

Development
As an aspiring game-developer, Peter Liepa reached out to a local publisher called "In-Home Software". They put him in touch with a young man (Chris Gray) who had submitted a game in Basic, that was not really commercial quality, but they thought it had potential. The project began with the intention of converting this game to machine language and releasing it through In-Home Software, but according to Liepa, it quickly became apparent that the game was very primitive. He decided to expand the idea and bring some more interesting dynamics to the game. He started coding a new project in Forth, which took about six months. About the time it became clear that this was a shippable product, Liepa migrated Boulder Dash from Forth to assembler.

Being dissatisfied with the lack of contact from In-Home Software, Liepa began searching for a new publisher. His choice was First Star Software and according to him the company was very happy to publish the game.

Ports
A port of the original title was licensed by Exidy for use with their Max-A-Flex arcade cabinet. This version released in 1984 allowed buying 30 seconds of game time. This was the first home computer title to be converted to an arcade console.

Reception

II Computing said that "Bright, colorful animation coupled with a breezy story line make this game more than just a momentary diversion." Computer Games magazine called it an "incredible addicting maze game along the lines of Dig Dug, but faster and more exciting."

Mean Machines gave the Game Boy port of Boulder Dash a score of 90%, praising it as "one of the finest video games ever written", describing the game as "one to buy as soon as possible" and noting its faithfulness to the original Commodore 64 version. The same publication reviewed the NES version favourably, stating that it was "an extremely impressive title" and "one of the greatest games ever written". It was given a 92% rating.

The ZX Spectrum version was placed ninth in the Your Sinclair Top 100 Speccy Games Of All Time (Ever) by journalist Stuart Campbell.

IGN reviewed the Virtual Console release of the Commodore 64 version. Although the graphics and sound were both found to be dated they enjoyed the game stating that it "still feels as fresh as it did in 1984". They concluded by stating "though it doesn't look like much, Boulder Dash rocks."

Boulder Dash was included in the top 30 Commodore 64 games by c’t Magazin in Germany.

The game sold more than 500,000 copies by August 1994.

Legacy
Following the original home computer title, other games in the series were published by First Star Software.
 Boulder Dash (1985 – Arcade) – in 1985 another arcade version was released on Data East's "DECO Cassette System", with improved graphics but a reduced display grid on a vertical monitor.
 Boulder Dash II (1985) – published under several different titles; Rockford's Riot on the MSX, Rockford's Revenge on the C64. The second release in Japan was titled Champion Boulder Dash, but it is not a port of the western game.
 Boulder Dash 3 (1986 – Apple II, C64, Spectrum, PC) – monochrome space-themed graphics and poorly designed levels made this a critical failure.
 Boulder Dash Construction Kit (1986 – Apple II, C64, Spectrum, Atari 8-bit computers, Atari ST) – this release included a small number of levels (12 caves and 3 intermission levels), but was titled Boulder Dash IV – The Game for the Spectrum re-release.  The title allowed players access to tools which allowed them to design their own levels.
 Super Boulder Dash (1986 – Apple II, C64, PC) – a compilation of Boulder Dash and Boulder Dash II published by Electronic Arts.
 Rockford (1988 – Arcade, Amiga, Atari 8-bit, Atari ST, Arcade, Spectrum, Amstrad, C64) - Rockford was originally a licensed arcade game produced by Arcadia Systems, and later converted to various home computer formats.
 Boulder Dash Part 2 (1990 – Arcade)
 Boulder Dash (1990 - Game Boy)
 Boulder Dash (1990 - NES)
 Boulder Dash EX (2002 – Game Boy Advance) - this one has a new "EX mode" and "Classic mode" which is a direct port of the 1984 PC version.
 Boulder Dash Xmas 2002 Edition (2002 – PC)
 GemJam Gold (2003 – PC) – the game's credits claim this is based on Boulder Dash, and is licensed by First Star.
 Boulder Dash – Treasure Pleasure (2003 – PC)
 Boulder Dash: Rocks! (2007 – DS, iOS)
 Boulder Dash Vol 1 (2009 – iOS)
 Boulder Dash-XL (2011 - Xbox Live Arcade, PC)
 Boulder Dash - The Collection! (2011 – Android)
 Boulder Dash (2011 – Atari 2600) - limited edition of 250 copies.
 Boulder Dash-XL 3D (2012 - Nintendo 3DS) - 3D port of Boulder Dash-XL.
 Boulder Dash-XL by HeroCraft (2012-2014 – iOS) - has a retro mode which copies the look of the classic Boulder Dash.
 Boulder Dash 30th Anniversary co-published by TapStar Interactive and First Star Software, Inc. with a world designed by the original creator Peter Liepa as well as another world by TapStar CEO, Chris Gray. This sequel was developed in collaboration by TapStar Interactive, First Star Software, SoMa Play Inc. and Katsu Entertainment LLC (2014 - Android, iOS) as both a Premium (paid) and a freemium game.
 Boulder Dash (2015 – Intellivision) – Co-published by First Star Software, Inc. and Classic Game Publishers, Inc./Elektronite
 Boulder Dash 30th Anniversary (2016 – iOS, Android, Switch, Steam (PC and Mac)) – co-published by TapStar Interactive and First Star Software, Inc. with a world designed by the original creator Peter Liepa as well as another world by Chris Gray.
 Boulder Dash Deluxe (2021 – Switch, Xbox, Atari VCS, Steam (PC and Mac), Windows Store and Mac Store) – developed and published by BBG Entertainment with a world designed by the original creator Peter Liepa and a Retro world with the 20 original levels from 1984.

References

Bibliography

External links
 Official website
 Archived website
 Boulder Dash for the Atari 8-bit family at Atari Mania
 
 Fan site with mechanics, implementation details
 Photos of packaging
 "Between a Rock and a Hard Diamond" Electron Dance, July 2011
Review in GAMES Magazine

1984 video games
Amstrad CPC games
Apple II games
Arcade video games
Atari 8-bit family games
BBC Micro and Acorn Electron games
ColecoVision games
Commodore 64 games
Data East video games
Exidy games
First Star Software games
Game Boy games
IOS games
MSX games
Nintendo Entertainment System games
Rocks-and-diamonds games
Single-player video games
Video game franchises introduced in 1984
Video games developed in Canada
Virtual Console games
Windows Phone games
ZX Spectrum games
Mirrorsoft games